Chile competed at the 2002 Winter Olympics in Salt Lake City, United States.

Alpine skiing

Men

Women

Biathlon

Men

Women

 1 A penalty loop of 150 metres had to be skied per missed target. 
 3 One minute added per missed target.

References
Official Olympic Reports
 Olympic Winter Games 2002, full results by sports-reference.com

Nations at the 2002 Winter Olympics
2002 Winter Olympics
Winter Olympics